The Men's downhill competition at the FIS Alpine World Ski Championships 2021 was held on 14 February 2021.

Austria's Vincent Kriechmayr won the gold medal, Andreas Sander of Germany took the silver, and the bronze medalist was Beat Feuz of Switzerland.

Results
The race started at 11:00 CET (UTC+1) under clear skies.

References

Men's downhill
2021